Ronin (formally written as Rōnin) is an American comic book limited series published between 1983 and 1984, by DC Comics. The series was written and drawn by Frank Miller with artwork painted by Lynn Varley. It takes place in a dystopic near-future New York City in which a ronin is reincarnated. The six-issue work shows some of the strongest influences of manga and bande dessinée on Miller's style, both in the artwork and narrative style.

Concept and creation 
The ideas for Ronin came together while Miller was doing extensive research into kung fu films, martial arts, samurai comic books and samurai ethics for his work on Daredevil. He remarked that "the aspect of the samurai that intrigues me most is the ronin, the masterless samurai, the fallen warrior. ... This entire project comes from my feelings that we, modern men, are ronin. We're kind of cut loose. I don't get the feeling from the people I know, the people I see on the street, that they have something greater than themselves to believe in. Patriotism, religion, whatever — they've all lost their meaning for us".

Ronin was in part inspired by Kazuo Koike and Goseki Kojima's manga series Kozure Ōkami. Though Kozure Ōkami would receive an English localization several years later as Lone Wolf and Cub, at the time Miller could not read the text and had to rely on the artwork for his understanding of the story. According to former Marvel Comics editor-in-chief Jim Shooter, Ronin was originally slated to be released as part of Marvel's Marvel Graphic Novel series. Ultimately, however, Miller was persuaded by publisher Jenette Kahn that DC Comics would give him as much freedom as he desired for the series, and DC published Ronin beginning in 1983.

Despite being both written and drawn by Miller, Ronin was created using the full script method; a full panel-by-panel script was written for each issue before any of it was drawn, though in some cases Miller made revisions to the story after he began drawing. For example, Miller has said that when he began drawing Ronin #1: "There was no explosion, no demon shot across the city. I'd planned a brief skirmish between the demon and the ronin, from which Virgo rescued the ronin. But, as I was working on the sequence, I realized that I had been building and building tension across the story and hadn't done anything to release it. The feeling of the story ... was that it needed something big to happen there, something to release the tension". In part to make room for this additional scene, Miller eliminated an extended sequence involving the Ronin and the woman and child he rescues.

Like an earlier DC maxi-series, Camelot 3000, Ronin was printed on a higher quality paper stock. Each issue contained 48 pages of story and no advertisements.

Plot
In feudal Japan, a young, nameless samurai has sworn to protect his master, Lord Ozaki, from assassins. Ozaki is assassinated at night by a demon called Agat in the guise of a geisha, in an act of revenge for Ozaki stealing his sword. The sword is powered by blood — if it can be fueled by the blood of an innocent, the sword will become powerful enough to destroy Agat. Ozaki has hidden the sword, so Agat cannot find it. The young samurai prepares to perform seppuku at his master's graveside. The spirit of Ozaki appears before him and demands that he find the sword and keep it from Agat until his skills are great enough to destroy the demon lord. The young samurai becomes a rōnin, wandering the countryside for many years. He comes to Agat's castle, and fights his way inside. Since the sword has never killed an innocent, it is not powerful enough to destroy Agat, so when Agat approaches him from behind, the ronin thrusts the sword through his own abdomen, impaling Agat. As Agat dies, he curses the ronin, and both their souls are trapped inside the sword until someone releases them.

Eight centuries later, social and economic collapse has left New York a lawless wasteland, populated by squatters, factions, and mutants. In the heart of the city is the Aquarius Complex, the headquarters of the Aquarius Corporation. The Aquarius Corporation is an idealistic company founded by three people: Peter McKenna, inventor of biocircuitry, his wife, Casey McKenna, Aquarius' head of security, and Mr. Taggart, who funded and controls Aquarius. The company is successful developing and marketing biocircuitry as a means of saving a world on the brink of war. Biocircuitry is a new model of plastics-based electronics, capable of self-organization and self-repair under the direction of Virgo, the artificial intelligence at the heart of the Aquarius Complex.

Aquarius's ward, Billy Challas, was born without any limbs due to a genetic defect and has telekinetic powers. Virgo works with him to develop his psionic abilities and Billy tests cutting-edge prosthetic limbs for Aquarius. Billy has been having vivid dreams of the story of Ozaki, the ronin, and Agat. Billy and Virgo are confused by the detail and historical accuracy of the dream since his education had never covered feudal Japan. 

Back at Aquarius, Virgo explains what has occurred to Casey McKenna, who assumes Virgo's logic units have been affected, but begins an investigation anyway. Agat infiltrates the complex, where he murders Taggart and assumes his form. In this guise, Agat begins negotiating a weapons deal with the Japan-based Sawa Corporation. Peter McKenna is outraged; he had created the technology under the agreement that it would be for non-violent purposes only. He confronts Taggart and realizes that he is an impostor. He informs Virgo, who is not only unshaken by this revelation, but immediately informs Taggart, forming a pact with him. Peter infiltrates Virgo's memory bank and forces her to show him what happened to Taggart. Even with the video replay, Peter refuses to believe the story and accuses Virgo of killing Taggart. He is kidnapped and held prisoner by Agat.

Head, an aging hippie who realizes that the ronin is his ticket to security, tells the ronin that he will 'manage' him and take care of him; the ronin passively acquiesces. Head plans to sell the ronin as "The Elvis of Violence", and makes deals with the heads of both the Nazi and Black factions to kill the other faction's leader in exchange for rice, beer, sterno, and a place to sleep.

Casey McKenna gets authorization to pursue and retrieve the ronin, understanding from Virgo that Billy Challas has somehow been transformed into a killer, and that the absence of effective law enforcement means that capturing him is Aquarius' responsibility. The three man team who finds the ronin, however, is killed without hesitation. Convinced of Virgo's story, Casey seeks permission to kill the ronin. Taggart denies this when Virgo informs him that the ronin is, in fact, Billy, complete with telekinetic power and, as such, might be useful in cybernetics. Casey finds the ronin dealing with the Nazi and Black factions and, despite her orders, attempts to kill him. Casey is knocked unconscious by the two factions before she can accomplish this and is thrown into a pit. The ronin kills both faction leaders, discards Head, and goes to rescue Casey.

The pit leads into sewers infested with cannibals, who swarm and kidnap Casey and the ronin. The ronin breaks free and slaughters the cannibals. Casey is surprised to find herself falling in love with the ronin. It snows shortly thereafter, for the first time in five years, and the ronin speaks English out of the blue. Casey and the ronin sleep together in the snow.

Peter, bound and gagged, is met by therapist Sandy. Peter convinces Sandy to free him and they try to make sense of all that has occurred. Peter concludes that Virgo kept the extent of Billy's powers a secret in order to exploit them, and that Billy created the ronin based around the television programs he loved so much as a kid, using his powers to create arms and legs built for himself and control Casey. Sandy, hearing this, thinks Peter is insane, and leaves him alone with Virgo.

Robots sent by Taggart attack the ronin and Casey, removing the ronin's mechanical arms and legs. Virgo, controlling the robots, starts a mental attack on the ronin, bringing forward Billy's repressed memory of murdering a local bully. Billy, enraged, regains his limbs, but a horde of flying robots subdue him and blast the subway tunnel where Casey had been trying to make her escape. Trapped, the ronin mentally reaches out to Casey, who regains consciousness within the rubble and kills a robot. Casey breaks into Aquarius, which by this point has engulfed the entire city. The ronin causes a blackout that allows Casey to escape the guards and find Peter. Virgo forces Agat to restrain himself, and address the workers about the blackout. Virgo confronts Billy mentally. Virgo soothes Billy and convinces him to stop helping Casey.

Casey, with the help of Learnid and Sandy, whom Learnid convinces of Peter's sanity, finds Peter. A physical wreck, Peter informs Casey that Billy is being manipulated by Virgo into turning fantasy into reality. A Virgo robot attacks and kills Peter. Reinvigorated by Casey's sadness, Billy begins questioning Virgo. When Casey is attacked by another robot, Billy is enraged and lashes out, destroying it. Virgo verbally castigates Billy, threatening to send him away (as his mother did after she saw him murder the bully) if he doesn't stop. Billy backs down.

Taggart, trying to calm the workers, is confronted by Learnid who accuses him of having been corrupted. Before Taggart can attack, Virgo orders him away, stating a life-threatening hazard has occurred. Learnid notes that regulations give him authority in such situations to evacuate non-essential personnel and forces Virgo to carry out the order.

Casey runs into Peter, now a deformed half-man/half-machine, who attacks her. Peter explains that Billy's powers gave Virgo a consciousness and Virgo wanted more. In order to increase his power, while keeping him under control, she manipulated him into creating the ronin, thereby releasing his power, but trapping him in fantasy. Virgo wants to make biocircuitry the new dominant life form on Earth. Casey kills Peter and tells Virgo to take her to the ronin. Once near him, she is transported back into fantasy, and keeps playing along. Kissing the ronin, they are confronted by Agat. Casey turns to confront him but rather than taking out her sword, she shoots him in the head. Agat's wiring explodes, revealing him to be a robot.

Sensing danger, Virgo tries in vain to talk Casey out of acting, to no avail. Casey frees the ronin, then humiliates him, as a woman had avenged his master where he had failed. Casey then gives him a sword to commit seppuku while acting as his second. As the ronin guts himself, Billy cries in agony. Virgo tries to scold him to take control but Billy can't control himself, blaming Virgo for making him feel worthless. The ronin shoves the sword into his heart, Casey kills him, and Billy unleashes a telekinetic blast which destroys Aquarius, and by extension, New York. The only ones left standing are Casey and the ronin.

Collected editions
The series has been collected into a single volume:
Ronin (302 pages, DC Comics, September 1987, March 1995)
Absolute Ronin (328 pages, DC Comics, October 2008, ; Titan Books, November 2008)
Ronin Deluxe Edition (336 pages, DC Comics, October 2014)

Sequel
On April 28, 2022, it was officially announced that Miller was launching a comic book publishing company titled Frank Miller Presents (FMP), with one of his initial contributions being the sequel Ronin Book Two.

Possible adaptations
In 1998, Darren Aronofsky signed a deal with New Line Cinema for a film adaptation of the graphic novel.
In 2007, Gianni Nunnari, producer of 300, announced he would be producing, and Sylvain White, director of Stomp the Yard, would be directing a Ronin film adaptation.

In April 2014 Syfy revealed that they were adapting Ronin into a miniseries.

Influence
Animation director Genndy Tartakovsky has stated that Ronin was one of the major influences on his animated TV series Samurai Jack, with Miller's 300 also inspiring an episode.

Ronin was also one of the inspirations behind the creation of Teenage Mutant Ninja Turtles and Wes Craig's art for Deadly Class from Image Comics.

References

External links

Comics characters introduced in 1983
Comics by Frank Miller (comics)
Comics set in New York City
DC Comics cyborgs
Fictional samurai
Fiction about reincarnation